James Marcus (born Brian T. James, 23 June 1942) is a British actor.

He is best known for his performance as Georgie, one of the droogs in Stanley Kubrick's controversial film A Clockwork Orange (1971). Before becoming an apprentice printer, he spent the majority of his teenage life performing gigs. After studying acting courses at the 15 Drama School in London, he had several roles in plays based on the works of Shakespeare. His first appearance on TV was the BBC show Hello, Good Evening and Welcome (1968). He also landed a role in the 1969 war comedy, The Virgin Soldiers.

In 1970, Kubrick got in touch with the young actor for an audition for his upcoming project, an adaptation of Anthony Burgess' novel A Clockwork Orange. Apart from his fight scenes, Kubrick was also impressed by James's dark demeanour and this won him the role. During filming, Kubrick described James as very professional.

His other TV appearances include UFO, Softly, Softly: Taskforce, The Sweeney, Doctor Who, Z-Cars and The Professionals. He also appeared in the Robin Askwith vehicle Let's Get Laid (1977) with John Clive, another Clockwork Orange actor. He also starred in The Naked Civil Servant (1975) with John Hurt, and McVicar (1980) with Roger Daltrey.

One of his other memorable roles is that of station officer Sidney Tate in the pilot and series 1-3 of the popular LWT Fire fighting drama London's Burning. He also directed the nihilistic Tank Malling (1989) which featured Ray Winstone.

He is currently involved in the TV/film industry devoting his time to acting (his recent role was in The Bill), producing and screen-writing.

List of credits

Television

Film

References

External links

English male film actors
English male television actors
Living people
1942 births